Beatrice Arthur (born Bernice Frankel; May 13, 1922 – April 25, 2009) was an American actress and comedian. Born and raised in Brooklyn, New York City, Arthur began her career on stage in 1947, attracting critical acclaim before achieving worldwide recognition for her work on television beginning in the 1970s as Maude Findlay in the popular sitcoms All in the Family (1971–1972) and Maude (1972–1978) and later in the 1980s and 1990s as Dorothy Zbornak on The Golden Girls (1985–1992).

Arthur won several accolades throughout her career, beginning with the 1966 Tony Award for Best Featured Actress in a Musical for playing Vera Charles in Mame. She won Emmy Awards for Outstanding Lead Actress in a Comedy Series in 1977 for Maude and 1988 for The Golden Girls. Arthur has received the third most nominations for the Primetime Emmy Award for Outstanding Lead Actress in a Comedy Series with nine; only Julia Louis-Dreyfus (11) and Mary Tyler Moore (10) have more. She was inducted into the academy's Television Hall of Fame in 2008.

Her film appearances include Lovers and Other Strangers (1970) and the film version of Mame (1974). In 2002, she starred in the one-woman show Bea Arthur on Broadway: Just Between Friends. An obituary described Arthur as "the tall, deep-voiced actress whose razor-sharp delivery of comedy lines made her a TV star."

Early life, family, education and military service
Bernice Frankel was born on May 13, 1922, in Brooklyn, New York City, to Rebecca ( Pressner, born in Austria) and Philip Frankel (born in Poland). Arthur was raised in a Jewish home with her older sister Gertrude and younger sister Marian (1926–2014).

In 1933, the Frankel family relocated to Cambridge, Maryland, where her parents subsequently operated a women's clothing shop. At age 16,  Bernice developed a serious condition, coagulopathy, in which her blood would not clot. Concerned for her health, her parents sent her to Linden Hall, an all-girls' boarding school in Lititz, Pennsylvania, for her final two years of high school. Afterwards, she studied for a year at Blackstone College for Girls in Blackstone, Virginia.

During World War II, Frankel enlisted as one of the first members of the United States Marine Corps Women's Reserve in 1943. After basic training, she served as a typist at Marine headquarters in Washington, D.C. In June 1943, the Marine Corps accepted her transfer request to the Motor Transport School at Camp Lejeune, North Carolina. Frankel then worked as a truck driver and dispatcher in Cherry Point, North Carolina, between 1944 and 1945. She was honorably discharged at the rank of staff sergeant in September 1945.

After serving in the Marines, Frankel studied for a year at the Franklin School of Science and Arts in Philadelphia, where she became a licensed medical technician. After interning at a local hospital for the summer, she decided against working as a lab technician, departing for New York City in 1947 to enroll in the School of Drama at The New School.

Career

Theater
From 1947, Beatrice Arthur studied at the Dramatic Workshop of The New School in New York City with German director Erwin Piscator. 

Arthur began her acting career as a member of an off-Broadway theater group at the Cherry Lane Theatre in New York City in the late 1940s. Onstage, her roles included Lucy Brown in the 1954 Off-Broadway premiere of Marc Blitzstein's English-language adaptation of Kurt Weill's The Threepenny Opera, Nadine Fesser in the 1957 premiere of Herman Wouk's Nature's Way at the Coronet Theatre, Yente the Matchmaker in the 1964 premiere of Fiddler on the Roof on Broadway.

In 1966, Arthur auditioned for the title role in the musical Mame, which her husband Gene Saks was set to direct, but Angela Lansbury won the role instead. Arthur accepted the supporting role of Vera Charles, for which she won great acclaim, winning a Tony Award for Best Featured Actress in a Musical the same year. She reprised the role in the 1974 film version opposite Lucille Ball. In 1981, she appeared in Woody Allen's The Floating Light Bulb.

She made her debut at the Metropolitan Opera in 1994 portraying the Duchess of Krakenthorp in Gaetano Donizetti's La fille du régiment. In 1995, she starred opposite Renée Taylor and Joseph Bologna in Bermuda Avenue Triangle in Los Angeles.

Television

In 1971, Arthur was invited by Norman Lear to guest-star on his sitcom All in the Family, as Maude Findlay, the cousin of Edith Bunker. An outspoken liberal feminist, Maude was considered the antithesis to the caricatured reactionary Archie Bunker, who described her as a "New Deal fanatic". Nearly 50, Arthur's tart turn on All in the Family impressed viewers as well as executives at CBS who, she would later recall, asked "'Who is that girl? Let's give her her own series.'"

That series, Maude, previewed in her second All in the Family appearance. The show, debuting in 1972, found her living in the affluent community of Tuckahoe, Westchester County, New York, with her fourth husband Walter (Bill Macy) and divorced daughter Carol (Adrienne Barbeau). Arthur's performance in the role garnered her several Emmy and Golden Globe nominations, winning an Emmy in 1977 for Outstanding Lead Actress in a Comedy Series. Maude earned a place for Arthur in the history of the women's liberation movement.

The series addressed serious sociopolitical topics of the era that were considered taboo for a sitcom, including the Vietnam War, the Nixon Administration, Maude's bid for a Congressional seat, divorce, menopause, drug use, alcoholism, nervous breakdown, mental illness, women's lib, gay rights, abortion, and spousal abuse. A prime example is "Maude's Dilemma", a two-part episode airing near Thanksgiving 1972 in which Maude's character grapples with a late-life pregnancy, ultimately deciding to have an abortion. Even though abortion had been legal in New York State since 1970, as well as in California since its state's 1969 on-demand ruling, it was illegal in many other regions of the country and, as such, sparked controversy. As a result, dozens of network affiliates refused to broadcast the episode, substituting either a repeat from earlier in the season or a Thanksgiving TV special in its place. However, by the time of the summer rerun season six months later,  the flak was reduced, and the stations that refused to air the episode upon its first run reinstated it for broadcast. As a result, a reported 65 million viewers watched the two-episode arc either on first run that November or during the following summer. The episode first aired two months before the U.S. Supreme Court legalized the procedure nationwide in the Roe v. Wade outcome in January 1973.

In 1978, during the show's sixth season, Arthur decided to exit the series. Later that year she costarred in Star Wars Holiday Special, in which she had a song and dance routine in the Mos Eisley cantina. She hosted The Beatrice Arthur Special on CBS on January 19, 1980, which paired the star in a musical comedy revue with Rock Hudson, Melba Moore and Wayland Flowers and Madame.

Arthur returned to television in the short-lived 1983 sitcom Amanda's (an adaptation of the British series Fawlty Towers). The show proved unsuccessful, with only 10 episodes broadcast of 13 filmed.In 1985, at the age of 63, Arthur was cast in The Golden Girls, in which she played Dorothy Zbornak, a divorced mother and substitute teacher living in a Miami, Florida, house owned by widow Blanche Devereaux (Rue McClanahan). Her other roommates included widow Rose Nylund (Betty White) and Dorothy's Sicilian mother, Sophia Petrillo (Estelle Getty). Getty was actually a year younger than Arthur in real life. Initially, Betty White was cast as the man-hungry Blanche, and Rue McClanahan (who had previously co-starred with Arthur in Maude) was cast as the naive Rose. Arthur refused to be in a show essentially about Maude and Vivian living with Sue Ann Nivens. After White and McClanahan switched roles, Arthur reconsidered. The series was a hit and remained a top-ten rating fixture for six of its seven seasons. Arthur's performances led to several Emmy nominations over the course of the series and an Emmy win in 1988. Arthur left the show after seven years, and in 1992, it moved from NBC to CBS and retooled as The Golden Palace in which the other three actresses reprised their roles, with Cheech Marin as their new foil. Arthur made a guest appearance in a two-part episode, but the new series lasted just one season.

In 1984, Arthur, who had otherwise refused to appear in advertising, accepted a lucrative offer from Canadian drugstore chain Shoppers Drug Mart to be their commercial spokeswoman, on the condition that the commercials would never be seen in the United States. Arthur spent seven years in the position, continuing as spokeswoman during her run on The Golden Girls by commuting to Toronto for commercial tapings.

Film
Arthur sporadically appeared in films, reprising her stage role as Vera Charles in the 1974 film adaption of Mame, opposite Lucille Ball. She portrayed overbearing mother Bea Vecchio in Lovers and Other Strangers (1970), and had a cameo as a Roman unemployment clerk in Mel Brooks' History of the World, Part I (1981). She appeared in the 1995 American movie For Better or Worse as Beverly Makeshift.

Later career
After Arthur left The Golden Girls, she made guest appearances on television shows and organized and toured in her one-woman show, alternately titled An Evening with Bea Arthur as well as And Then There's Bea. She made a guest appearance on the American cartoon Futurama, in the Emmy-nominated 2001 episode "Amazon Women in the Mood", as the voice of the feminist "Femputer" who ruled a race of giant Amazonian women. She appeared in a first-season episode of Malcolm in the Middle as Mrs. White, one of Dewey's babysitters who was a strict disciplinarian. She was nominated for an Emmy for Outstanding Guest Actress in a Comedy Series for her performance. She appeared as Larry David's mother on Curb Your Enthusiasm.

In 2002, she returned to Broadway, starring in Bea Arthur on Broadway: Just Between Friends, a collection of stories and songs (with musician Billy Goldenberg) based on her life and career. The show was nominated for a Tony Award for Best Special Theatrical Event.

In addition to appearing in programs looking back at her own work, Arthur performed in stage and television tributes for Jerry Herman, Bob Hope, Ellen DeGeneres. In 2004, she appeared in Richard Barone's "There'll Be Another Spring: A Tribute to Miss Peggy Lee" at the Hollywood Bowl, performing "Johnny Guitar" and "The Shining Sea". In 2005, she participated in the Comedy Central roast of Pamela Anderson, where she recited sexually explicit passages from Anderson's book Star Struck in a deadpan fashion.

Influences 
In 1999, Arthur told an interviewer of the three influences in her career: "Sid Caesar taught me the outrageous; [method acting guru] Lee Strasberg taught me what I call reality; and [original Threepenny Opera star] Lotte Lenya, whom I adored, taught me economy." Another source of influence to Arthur was that of famed actress/director Ida Lupino, whom Arthur praised: "My dream was to become a very small blonde movie star like Ida Lupino and those other women I saw up there on the screen during the Depression."

Personal life

Arthur was married twice. Her first marriage took place in 1944, during her time in the military when she wed fellow Marine Robert Alan Aurthur, later a screenwriter, television, and film producer and director. They divorced three years later, but she kept his surname, with the spelling adjusted to Arthur. Shortly after they divorced in 1950, she married director Gene Saks with whom she adopted two sons, Matthew, an actor, and Daniel, a set designer.  She and Saks remained married until 1978.

In 1972, she moved to Los Angeles and sublet her apartment on Central Park West in New York City and her country home in Bedford, New York. In a 2003 interview, while in London promoting her one-woman show, she described the English capital as her "favorite city in the world".

Arthur was a longtime champion of equal rights for women and an active advocate of the elderly and Jewish communities in both her major television roles and through her charity work and personal outspokenness. Contrary to the character she played as Maude, she was originally skeptical of the women's rights movement. Following her divorce from Gene Saks, she later adopted the language of that movement.

Considered a longtime gay icon, she embraced the gay community that had supported her since the 1970s. Late in life, Arthur took up the cause of LGBTQ+ youth homelessness. She raised $40,000 for the Ali Forney Center with one of her final live performances, a revival of her one-woman Broadway show in 2005 after she had fallen ill with cancer. She would go on to advocate for the center until her death, telling
Next Magazine, "These kids at the Ali Forney Center are literally dumped by their families because they are lesbian, gay or transgender — this organization really is saving lives."

Arthur was a private and introverted woman according to her friends. She was a particularly close mentor and friend to Adrienne Barbeau, who co-starred with her on Maude for six seasons. Barbeau was unavailable to perform regularly on the sitcom during its last season due to her schedule; nevertheless, the two remained close and stayed in touch for the rest of Arthur's life. In a 2018 interview with the American website Dread Central, Barbeau shared some of her feelings about her friend:

Death and legacy
Arthur died of lung cancer at her home in Brentwood, Los Angeles on April 25, 2009, aged 86.

On April 28, 2009, the Broadway community paid tribute to Arthur by dimming the marquees of New York City's Broadway theater district in her memory for one minute at 8:00 p.m. On September 16, 2009, a public tribute to Arthur was held at the Majestic Theatre in Manhattan, where friends and colleagues including Angela Lansbury, Norman Lear, Rosie O'Donnell and Rue McClanahan paid tribute to the actress.

Arthur's surviving co-stars from The Golden Girls, McClanahan and White, commented on her death via telephone on an April 27 episode of Larry King Live. On the Today Show by phone, McClanahan said she and Arthur got along together "like cream." White said "I knew it would hurt, I just didn't know it would hurt this much."

Longtime friends Adrienne Barbeau (with whom she had worked on Maude) and Angela Lansbury (with whom she had worked in Mame) reflected on her death. Barbeau said, "We've lost a unique, incredible talent. No one could deliver a line or hold a take like Bea and no one was more generous or giving to her fellow performers." Lansbury said, "She became and has remained my bosom buddy [...] I am deeply saddened by her passing, but also relieved that she is released from the pain."

Arthur bequeathed $300,000 to the Ali Forney Center, a New York City organization that provides housing for homeless LGBTQ+ youths. The center was heavily damaged in October 2012 by Hurricane Sandy, but has since been restored and re-opened. The Bea Arthur Residence, which opened in 2017, is an 18-bed residence in Manhattan for homeless LGBT youth operated by the Ali Forney Center.

Awards

An Emmy and Tony Award winner, Arthur was an Academy Award away from achieving the Triple Crown of Acting status.

Arthur won the American Theatre Wing's Tony Award in 1966 as Best Featured Actress in a Musical for her performance that year as Vera Charles in the original Broadway production of Jerry Herman's musical Mame.

Arthur received the third most nominations for the Primetime Emmy Award for Outstanding Lead Actress in a Comedy Series with nine; only Julia Louis-Dreyfus (11) and Mary Tyler Moore (10) have more. She received the Academy of Television Arts & Sciences' Emmy Award for Outstanding Lead Actress in a Comedy Series twice, once in 1977 for Maude and again in 1988 for The Golden Girls. She also received the third most nominations for the Golden Globe Award for Best Actress – Television Series Musical or Comedy with eight, only Carol Burnett (12) and Candice Bergen (9) have more; Arthur tied with Debra Messing as actress with most nominations without ever winning.

Arthur was inducted into the academy's Television Hall of Fame in 2008.

On June 8, 2008, The Golden Girls was awarded the Pop Culture award at the Sixth Annual TV Land Awards. Arthur (in one of her final public appearances) accepted the award with McClanahan and White.

Filmography

Film

Television

Theater performances

References

External links

Bea Arthur Interview, emmytvlegends.org; accessed June 13, 2014.
Bea Arthur profile, Comedy Hall of Fame website; accessed June 13, 2014.
Beatrice Arthur at the University of Wisconsin's Actors Studio audio collection; accessed June 13, 2014.
Beatrice Arthur profile by Kirsten Fermaglich, Jewish Women Encyclopedia; accessed June 13, 2014.
N.Y. Times obituary, April 26, 2009; accessed June 13, 2014.
"Huffington Post" obituary; April 25, 2014; accessed June 13, 2014.
"Beatrice Arthur: A towering comedic talent from another era", L.A. Times, August 27, 2009; accessed June 13, 2014
Entertainment Weekly article about her death, ew.com; accessed June 13, 2014.
Beatrice Arthur obituary, Daily Telegraph; accessed June 13, 2014.

1922 births
2009 deaths
20th-century American actresses
21st-century American actresses
20th-century American comedians
21st-century American comedians
20th-century American singers
20th-century American women singers
Activists from Maryland
Actresses from Maryland
Blackstone College for Girls alumni
American contraltos
American feminists
American film actresses
American musical theatre actresses
American people of Austrian-Jewish descent
American people of Polish-Jewish descent
American stage actresses
American television actresses
Television personalities from New York City
American women television personalities
American women comedians
American women's rights activists
California Democrats
Deaths from lung cancer in California
Jewish activists
Jewish American actresses
Jewish feminists
Jewish women singers
American LGBT rights activists
Marine Corps Women's Reserve personnel
New York (state) Democrats
Outstanding Performance by a Lead Actress in a Comedy Series Primetime Emmy Award winners
People from Cambridge, Maryland
Tony Award winners
The New School alumni
Comedians from New York City
Military personnel from New York City
Jewish American female comedians
United States Marine Corps non-commissioned officers
20th-century American Jews
21st-century American Jews
Jewish women activists